In baseball, a submarine is a pitch in which the ball is released often just above the ground, but not underhanded, with the torso bent at a right angle, and shoulders tilted so severely that they rotate around a nearly horizontal axis. This is in stark contrast to the underhand softball pitch in which the torso remains upright, the shoulders are level, and the hips do not rotate.

Description
The "upside down" release of the submariner causes balls to move differently from pitches generated by other arm slots. Gravity plays a significant role, for the submariner's ball must be thrown considerably above the strike zone, after which it drops rapidly back through. The sinking motion of the submariner's fastball is enhanced by forward rotation, in contrast with the overhand pitcher's hopping backspin.

Submarine pitches are often the toughest for same-side batters to hit (i.e., a right-handed submarine pitcher is the more difficult for a right-handed batter to hit, and likewise for  left-handed pitchers and batters). This is because the submariner's spin is not perfectly level; the ball rotates forward and toward the pitching arm side, jamming same-sided hitters at the last moment, even as the ball drops rapidly through the zone.

The rarity of submarine pitchers is almost certainly attributable to its unusual technique. It is not typically a natural style of throwing—it is often a learned style—and because the vast majority of pitchers use an overarm motion, most young pitchers are encouraged to throw overhand.

Though the bending motion required to pitch effectively as a submariner means that submariners may be more at risk of developing back problems, it is commonly thought that the submarine motion is less injurious to the elbow and shoulder.  Kent Tekulve and Gene Garber, two former submarine pitchers, were among the most durable pitchers in baseball history with 1,944 appearances between the two.

Past major league submariners include Carl Mays, Ted Abernathy, Elden Auker, Chad Bradford, Mark Eichhorn, Gene Garber, Kent Tekulve, Todd Frohwirth, and Dan Quisenberry. Steve Olin was also a submarine pitcher.

Japanese pitcher Shunsuke Watanabe is known as "Mr. Submarine" in Japan. Watanabe has an even lower release point than the typical submarine pitcher, dropping his pivot knee so low that it scrapes the ground. He now wears a pad under his uniform to avoid injuring his knee. His release is so low that his knuckles often become raw from their periodic drag on the ground.

Submarine pitchers

Current players

Major League Baseball
 Adam Cimber
 Darren O'Day
 Brian Moran
 Wyatt Mills
 Tyler Rogers
 Joe Smith
 Tim Hill
 Eric Yardley

Nippon Professional Baseball
 Kazuhisa Makita
 Rei Takahashi
 Hirofumi Yamanaka
 Kaito Yoza

KBO League
 Park Jong-hoon
Dae-woo Kim

Chinese Professional Baseball League (Taiwan)
 Lin Chen-hua
 Huang Tzu-Peng

Former players
 Ted Abernathy
 Chad Bradford
 Tae-Hyon Chong
 Byung-hyun Kim
 Terry Leach
 Porter Moss
 Dan Quisenberry
 Gus Schlosser
 Kent Tekulve
 Shunsuke Watanabe
 Kelly Wunsch
 Brad Ziegler
 Gene Garber
 Carl Mays
 Steve Olin
 Mark Eichhorn
 Todd Frohwirth
 Elden Auker
 Mike Myers (baseball)

See also
Sidearm

References

 

Baseball pitching
Biomechanics
Motor skills
Motor control
Throwing